Nidularium procerum is a species of bromeliad in the genus Nidularium.

This species is endemic to the Atlantic Forest ecoregion of southeastern Brazil.

Cultivars
 Nidularium 'Odd Ball'
 Nidularium 'Stripes'
 × Nidbergia 'Chas Hodgson'
 × Niduregelia 'Joker'

References

BSI Cultivar Registry . retrieved 11 October 2009.

procerum
Endemic flora of Brazil
Flora of the Atlantic Forest
Flora of Bahia
Flora of Espírito Santo
Flora of Paraná (state)
Flora of Rio de Janeiro (state)
Flora of Rio Grande do Sul
Flora of Santa Catarina (state)
Flora of São Paulo (state)